The United Citizens Party (UCP) was first organized in 1969 in the U.S. state of South Carolina in response to the state Democratic Party's opposition to nominating black candidates.  The party's objective was to elect blacks to the legislature and local offices in counties with black majority populations. The party ran candidates in 1970 and 1972; as a result in 1970 the first three black candidates were elected to the South Carolina House of Representatives since Reconstruction.

In South Carolina, as in New York and unlike most other states, a single candidate may be nominated by two or more legally separate political parties.  This practice is called electoral fusion.  In the past, several South Carolina state legislators, who concurrently served as Democrats, were cross-endorsed by the United Citizens Party.  Other political parties that have practiced fusion include the New York Conservative Party, the Working Families Party of New York and the Liberal Party of New York. The American Labor Party was a historically important party in New York State which both practiced fusion and elected candidates independently.

Since the opening up of the state Democratic Party to black candidates, the party has mainly served as a means for various third party candidates to appear on the South Carolina Presidential ballot.

For a period of time in the 1990s the party used the name Patriot Party before returning to its original and current name.

History
In 1974, the political scientists Hanes Walton Jr. and William H. Boone cited the UCP up to that point as an example of a successful sub-national African American political party.

In 1996, Ross Perot was the nominee of both the Reform Party (which yielded 27,464 votes) and the United Citizens Party then known as the  Patriot Party (36,913 votes).

In the 2000 election, the UCP nominated Ralph Nader for President in South Carolina.  He received 20,279 votes or about 1.5% of the total 1,384,253.

In the 2002 election for the Second Congressional District in South Carolina, Mark Whittington received 17,189 votes or 10.03% of the total, after picketing the national headquarters of the Bank of America in Charlotte, N.C.

In 2004, the UCP chose to nominate the Socialist Party candidate Walt Brown for President.  Brown received 2,124 votes or about 0.1% of the total 1,617,730. 
Ralph Nader appeared on the South Carolina ballot as an independent, receiving 5520 votes or 0.3%. David Cobb appeared on the new South Carolina Green Party ballot line and received 1488 votes or 0.09% of the statewide total.

In 2006, the Party endorsed John "JC" Nellums for State House District 79 (Kershaw, Richland), and did not cross-endorse candidates of any other party.

On March 29, 2008, the party endorsed Barack Obama via convention for the 2008 presidential election,  but the nomination was not accepted.  Obama appeared on the ballot as solely as the candidate of the Democratic Party.

In 2010, the party cross-endorsed former football player Morgan Bruce Reeves for governor, alongside the South Carolina Green Party. Reeves received 0.9% of the vote.

On the November 2014 ballot, the party nominated Morgan Bruce Reeves for Governor and David Edmond for Commissioner of Agriculture. Reeves received 0.5% of the vote.

In 2018 and 2022, Chris Nelums ran as a United Citizens Party candidate for Commissioner of Agriculture. In 2018 Nelums received 118,671 votes, or 8.85% of the vote; in 2022, he received 95,625 votes, or 6.84% of the vote.

Presidential nominee
 1972 – George McGovern
 1984 – Dennis Serrette
 1988 – Lenora Fulani
 1992 – Lenora Fulani
 1996 – Ross Perot (Patriot Party) – Party name at time see above
 2000 – Ralph Nader
 2004 – Walt Brown
 2008 – Barack Obama

References

External links 
 Kevin Gray for Governor. Archived United Citizens Party 2002 Gubernatorial campaign site.  Archive date December 2, 2002. Retrieved from Library of Congress Minerva archive on June 21, 2006.
  Mark Whittington for Congress. United Citizens Party 2002 candidate for House, South Carolina, 2nd District.  Archive date Dec 2, 2002. Retrieved from Library of Congress Minerva archive on January 1, 2012.
 John Roy Harper II, Chair, United Citizens Party, holds press conference, 1970
 John Roy Harper II papers, University of South Carolina

See also 
 Peoples, Betsy. Historically Black political party still alive.  The New Crisis. Nov/Dec 2002.
 

Regional and state political parties in the United States
Political parties established in 1969
Black political parties in the United States
Political parties in South Carolina
African-American history of South Carolina
1969 establishments in South Carolina